Blinder is a surname. Notable people with the surname include:

Alan Blinder (born 1945), American economist, former Federal Reserve Vice Chairman
Martin Blinder (born 1937), American forensic psychiatrist
Naoum Blinder (1889–1965), Ukrainian-American virtuoso violinist and teacher
Olga Blinder (1921–2008), Paraguayan artist
Seymour Blinder (born 1932), American scientist
Isaac Blinder (born 1996), Software Engineer